The SC Scorpion is a Ukrainian single-place paraglider that was designed and produced by SC Paragliding of Kharkiv. It is now out of production.

Design and development
The Scorpion was designed as an advanced cross country glider. The models are each named for their wing area in square metres.

Variants
Scorpion 22
Extra small-sized model for lighter pilots.
Scorpion 25
Small-sized model for lighter pilots.
Scorpion 27
Mid-sized model for medium-weight pilots.
Scorpion 30
Large-sized model for heavier pilots.

Specifications (Scorpion 25)

See also
SC Discovery

References

Scorpion
Paragliders